Andy Biskin (né Andrew Barry Biskin; born 1955 in San Antonio, Texas), is an American jazz clarinetist, bass clarinetist, composer, and filmmaker based primarily in New York City.

Career 
Biskin is a graduate of Yale University and once served as an assistant for Alan Lomax. Biskin's music has often been played on NPR between segments on All Things Considered and Fresh Air with Terry Gross. In 2000, Biskin's album, Dogmental, was named album of the week in The New York Times by Ben Ratliff.

In 2004, he animated and set to music a series of Rube Goldberg machines, including a "self-operating napkin", for his film Goldberg's Variations.

Discography

As leader
 Dogmental (GM, 2000)
 Early American: The Melodies of Stephen Foster (Strudelmedia, 2006)
 Trio Tragico (Strudelmedia, 2006)
 Act Necessary (Strudelmedia, 2014)

Video
 Lily Dale: Messages from the Spirit Side of Life (documentary), Cinema Guild (1991); 
 Produced and directed by Biskin

References 

Post-bop clarinetists
American jazz clarinetists
American jazz bass clarinetists
Bass clarinetists
Year of birth missing (living people)
Living people
Yale University alumni
21st-century clarinetists